Nathan Marcuvitz (1913 - 2010) was an American electrical engineer, physicist, and educator who worked in the fields of microwave and electromagnetic field theory. He was head of the experimental group of the Radiation Laboratory (MIT). He was a member of the National Academy of Engineering. He had a PhD in electrical engineering from Polytechnic Institute of Brooklyn.

Biography
Marcuvitz was born on December 29, 1913, in Brooklyn, New York.

Marcuvitz was a significant figure on the field of electromagnetic waves.

The crucial period in the development of the microwave field occurred during World War II, when the magnetron furnished a reliable source of electromagnetic waves and made radar feasible, but progress was initially slow because designs had employed empirical and cut-and-try procedures.  What was needed were quantitative methods for characterizing the geometric structures involved and phrasing those methods in network terms.  Marcuvitz headed the experimental group at the M.I.T. Radiation Laboratory, which was responsible for developing an accurate measurement set-up and a new measurement procedure for determining with great precision the network parameters of geometric discontinuities.

He also worked closely with the physicists and mathematicians responsible for the theoretical part of the systematic program, and showed them how to cast their solutions in engineering terms.  As a result, the theoretical analyses were phrased in the network terms required for design, and the analytical results were compared with measurements under Marcuvitz' direction.  Since Marcuvitz played the key role in coordinating the theoretical and experimental phases, he was asked to be the author of the Waveguide Handbook (1951), which became vol. 10 of the M.I.T. Radiation Laboratory Series.

Marcuvitz is best known as an extremely able microwave field theorist, rather than an experimentalist.  This transition from experimentalist to theorist was made easier because of his close association with Julian Schwinger. Soon after his arrival in Cambridge, Massachusetts, Marcuvitz, together with Robert Marshak, who later became President of the City College of New York, rented a house near Harvard Square.  Some of the rooms were rented to others who worked at the Radiation Laboratory, and Schwinger was one of those people.  This arrangement lasted for only a year.

Schwinger worked during the night and slept all day.  Marcuvitz would wake him up at 7:30 P.M., and they would go to dinner.  After that they would often discuss their research problems until midnight, after which Marcuvitz would go home to bed and Schwinger would begin his work.

The Waveguide Handbook was one of his major contributions to the field.

Marcuvitz has also made many other significant contributions to electromagnetic waves.  These include an explanation of the nature of leaky waves and how to calculate them, a new derivation for small aperture and small obstacle expressions, radial and spherical transmission line theories, new results for propagation through periodic structures, and so on.  Some of these studies have been compiled into a comprehensive book, Radiation and Scattering of Waves (1973), coauthored with his former student, L. B. Felsen.

Most of the research projects were conducted under the aegis of the Microwave Research Institute (MRI).  This institute became widely regarded internationally as the foremost research organization in the world in microwave field theory.  For many years, it attracted post-doctoral researchers from around the world to spend a year or more, coming from such countries as Japan, France, U.S.S.R., Israel, Italy, England, Denmark, Sweden, Hungary, Poland, and Finland.  Many of those researchers have since become famous in their own right.  MRI was also well known for its series of annual symposia on topics in the forefront of the electronics field, and for the symposium proceedings volumes, 24 in all, that accompanied them.

Not only did MRI produce much important research in microwave field theory, but it also trained a whole generation of microwave engineers.  The journal, MicroWaves, in an interview with many microwave engineers in 1968, asked them various questions, including from what school they received their microwave education.  One of the article's conclusions was that more microwave engineers graduated from Brooklyn Polytechnic than from any other school, and that the second was M.I.T., with only half as many microwave graduates.

He died February 14, 2010, in Naples, Florida.

Published works
Waveguide Handbook, Vol. 10, 1951, 
Radiation and Scattering of Waves, 1973 (with L. Felsen)
Also numerous papers and articles.

Selected honors and awards
Member, National Academy of Engineering, 1978
IEEE Fellow, Heinrich Hertz Medal (Gold Medal and Monetary Award, IEEE highest
recognition for electromagnetic waves), (He was the first recipient, 1989)
Microwave Career Award from the IEEE Microwave Theory and Techniques Society in 1985

Family
Son of Samuel and Rebecca M.(Feiner); Married Muriel Spanier, June 30, 1946; 2 children.

See also 
List of members of the National Academy of Engineering (Electronics)

References

 Portions of this section originally contributed by Arthur A. Oliner were later incorporated by him into a more detailed article that was published in IEEE Microwave Magazine December 2010.
 A. A. Oliner, "Historical Perspectives on Microwave Field Theory", IEEE Transactions on Microwave Theory and Techniques, Vol. MTT-32, No. 9, September 1984, https://web.archive.org/web/20110927031702/https://www.ecs.umass.edu/ece/ece584/oliner.pdf

1913 births
2010 deaths
American electrical engineers
Members of the United States National Academy of Engineering
Polytechnic Institute of New York University alumni
Polytechnic Institute of New York University faculty
Electrical engineering academics
Microwave engineers